Chappell Hill Public School is a historic school on Poplar Street in Chappell Hill, Texas.  The old bell from Chappell Hill Female College, which was at this location until 1912, is preserved on the property.

The public school was built in 1927, replacing the college building, which was used as a school until 1926. It was added to the National Register of Historic Places in 1985.  Today it serves as the Chappell Hill Historical Society's museum.

See also

National Register of Historic Places listings in Washington County, Texas

References

National Register of Historic Places in Washington County, Texas
School buildings completed in 1927
Buildings and structures in Washington County, Texas
School buildings on the National Register of Historic Places in Texas
1927 establishments in Texas
History of women in Texas